Gudiyatham or 'Gudiyattam' is a state assembly constituency in Tamil Nadu, India. Its State Assembly Constituency number is 46. It comprises portions of the Gudiyattam and Vaniyambadi taluks and is a part of the Vellore parliamentary constituency for national elections. The seat is reserved for candidates from the Scheduled Castes. It is one of the 234 State Legislative Assembly Constituencies in Tamil Nadu in India.

Members of the Legislative Assembly

Madras State

Tamil Nadu

Election Results

2021

2019 By-election

2016

2011

2006

2001

1996

1991

1989

1984

1980

1977

1971

1967

1962

1957

1952

References 

 

Assembly constituencies of Tamil Nadu
Vellore district